Russell Hulse is a retired Belizean soccer player who played for Maccabi Los Angeles from 1977 thru 1982 winning the National Challenge Cup (US Open Cup) 3 times in 1977, 1978 and 1981 and appearing in the final in 1980 and 1982.

References

Year of birth missing (living people)
Living people
Belizean footballers
Belizean expatriate footballers
Expatriate soccer players in the United States
Belizean expatriate sportspeople in the United States
Association football defenders